Saltdean United Football Club are a football club based in Saltdean, which is a suburb of Brighton & Hove, England.

History

Saltdean United formed in 1966 by seven founding members who were inspired by the victorious England World Cup campaign. The club started life in the local Brighton Saturday League and gradually moved up their divisional structure over the years. Following the acquisition of their picturesque ground at Hill Park in the suburbs of Brighton, the club joined Division 3 of the Sussex County League in 1984/85, finishing third in their first season.  More success followed and a promotion to Division 2 and senior football came in 1988/89 when Saltdean finished as champions. The next seven seasons were spent in this division, with the “Tigers” comfortably winning Division 2 in 1995/96 with games to spare. Promotion to Division 1 saw the clubhouse completely revamped and floodlights installed, the first Sussex County League club to invest in the impressive Musco system from the USA. The Tigers quickly established themselves as a force in the top division, finishing 4th in their inaugural season and reaching the final of the Sussex Senior Cup only to narrowly lose out to St. Leonards by the odd goal.

In 1998/99 the club finished 2nd, and 3rd in 1999/2000 season when they also lifted the John O’Hara Cup, beating Burgess Hill Town after extra time in a thrilling match at Three Bridges. In 2002 the club suffered its first ever relegation to Division 2 and in 2007 were relegated again back to Division 3 where they remained for several years until 2011 when the club won the Sussex County League Division 3 Challenge Cup. A positive run in 2011/12 season saw the Tigers show their true spirit as they began the steady climb back up. As runners up in the league they were promoted back to Division 2 and also lifted the Vernon Wentworth Cup.

A difficult period followed, with several years spent in the lower half of Division 2 until the 2015/16 season when a change of circumstances, interest and investment in the club brought a new lease of life to the Tigers. Led by a celebrated ex player with the support of local businessmen the club was transformed on and off the pitch. Within a single season Saltdean Utd went from bottom to top of the league gaining promotion back to the top flight of Sussex football in 2017 and in 2018/19 the Tigers were the proud winners of the Peter Bentley Challenge Cup.

In 2017 the Saltdean United Women’s team were formed under the management of Joe McTiffen. The Women have gone from strength to strength and have enjoyed several promotions in a short period of time. As runners up of the Sussex Women’s league in 2017/18, they were promoted to the South East Counties Premier Division. In 2018/19 as runners up in the league they were promoted to the London and South East Premier Division and were winners of the South East Counties Women’s League Cup.

Into a new decade and the club continues to thrive, with the First Team enjoying a strong start to the 2020/21 season in the Southern Combination Football League Premier Division under the management of Bryan O’Toole. The Women’s team continue to strengthen their position with the addition of a new Development Squad in 2020 and a partnership with Withdean Youth FC to provide a clear pathway for girls into senior Women’s football.

The hard work continues throughout the club, with representation in more leagues and divisions than ever before in the club’s history with Men’s and Women’s First Teams, Women’s Development Squad, Men’s Under 23’s and Under 18’s and Youth Teams from Under 7’s to Under 16’s.

The 2021–22 season saw Saltdean finish second in the division and despite having a high enough points-per-game record to gain promotion to the Isthmian League, the club were denied promotion after failing ground grading requirements.

Ground

Saltdean United play their home games at Hill Park, Coombe Vale, Saltdean, Brighton, BN2 8HJ.

Honours

Cup honours
Peter Bentley League Challenge Cup
 Winners (1) 2018–19
The Sussex Royal Ulster Rifles Charity Cup
 Runners Up (3): 1995–96, 1999–00, 2021–22
Sussex County Football League Division Three Cup:
 Runners up (1): 1985-86
John o'hara cup winners 1999/00 at three bridges

Club Records
Highest League Position:
2nd in Sussex County League Division One: 1998–99
FA CUP Best Performance
Third Qualifying Round: 2000–01
FA VASE Best Performance
First Round: 1999-00

Notable former players
1. Players that have played/Managed in the football league or any foreign equivalent to this level (i.e. fully professional league).
2. Players with full international caps.
3. Players that hold a club record or have captained the club.
Jay Lovett – (1997–1998) played for Brentford
Glenn Burvill – played for Aldershot, Reading and Fulham
Paul Ifill – (?–1998) Barbados International
Glen Davies – played for Hartlepool
Paul Hubbard ENG Played for Brighton and Hove Albion 1976-1979.

References

External links
Club website

Football clubs in England
Southern Combination Football League
Sport in Brighton and Hove
Football clubs in East Sussex
Association football clubs established in 1966
1966 establishments in England
Brighton, Hove & District Football League